Bostock is a village and civil parish in Cheshire.

Bostock may also refer to:

 Bostock (surname), a surname (including a list of persons with the name) 
 Bostock Hall, a country house in England
 Bostock Island, an island in the Pacific Ocean

See also
 Bostock's Cup, British comedy drama from 1999
 Bostock Library, one of the Duke University Libraries, US
 Bostock Chambers, an office building in Australia
 Bostock v. Clayton County, Georgia, a 2020 decision of the Supreme Court of the United States dealing with discrimination of employees due to sexual orientation
 Bostick (disambiguation)